Egon Sørensen (February 16, 1913 - October 25, 1981)  was a Danish amateur football goalkeeper and club manager, who played 18 games for the Denmark national football team. Due to World War II, 6 of his last 9 internationals were matches against Sweden. Sørensen spent his entire club career with BK Frem, playing 237 matches for the club.

Egon Sørensen was a physically strong goalkeeper, able to play as an outfield player. At Frem, he was well trained by the shots of international centre forward Pauli Jørgensen, who later became team coach. Sørensen made his debut for the Danish national team in 1935, and competed with Aksel Daniel Nielsen and Ove Jensen to replace international veteran Svend Jensen. They were all eventually eclipsed by Eigil Nielsen.

Sørensen was also a dedicated handballer, and represented the Denmark men's national handball team at the 1938 World Men's Handball Championship. He worked as a boots and shoes dealer.

Honours
Danish Football Championships: 1935-36, 1940–41 and 1943–44 with Frem

References

External links
Danish national team profile
 Boldklubben Frem profile

1913 births
1981 deaths
Danish men's footballers
Denmark international footballers
Boldklubben Frem players
Danish male handball players
Danish football managers
Køge Boldklub managers
Kolding IF managers
Association football goalkeepers
Footballers from Copenhagen